Robert Gustave Édouard Liottel (23 September 1885 – 23 April 1968) was a French fencer. He won a gold medal in the team épée competition at the 1924 Olympic Games.

References

External links
 

1885 births
1968 deaths
People from Romilly-sur-Seine
Sportspeople from Aube
French male épée fencers
Olympic fencers of France
Fencers at the 1924 Summer Olympics
Olympic gold medalists for France
Olympic medalists in fencing
Medalists at the 1924 Summer Olympics
20th-century French people